Pyrrhia victorina is a moth of the family Noctuidae. It is found in Bulgaria, Greece, Romania, Slovenia, former Yugoslavia (including Croatia, Serbia, Bosnia and Herzegovina and North Macedonia) and Daghestan.

Description from Seitz
Forewing sulphur yellow: the veins and lines deep rosy purple; a rosy sinuous median shade passing over the discocellular; an outer and a submarginal line, the latter not reaching costa: a fine dark purple terminal line; fringe sulphur yellow; hindwing suffused with blackish fuscous, with darker veins and submarginal band, wholly blackish in female; the fringe white; occurring in S. E. Europe only, Servia, Bulgaria, S. Russia, the Caucasus, Armenia, Asia Minor, and N. Kurdistan;
the form described as prazanoffzkyi Guen. (46 h) from Amasia is much paler in both wings, with all the
rosy tints much reduced : the underside pale instead of purplish fuscous. — Larva dull green or violet red dorsal line very faint; subdorsal pale, slender, interrupted at the segmental incisions; lateral lines broader, the reddish spiracles placed on their upper margin; tubercles black; head black brown; thoracic plate yellowish: feeding on Dictamnus and Salvia.

References

External links
Image
The Noctuidae (Lepidoptera) of the Daghestan Republic (Russia)

Heliothinae
Insects of Turkey